Back to Bach (released as Jazz Sébastien Bach, Vol. 2 in France) is a 1968 album released by the Paris-based Swingle Singers.

All tracks from this album are also included on the CD re-issue / compilation, Jazz Sebastian Bach (combined with all tracks from 1963's Bach's Greatest Hits a.k.a. Jazz Sébastien Bach (Vol. 1)) and also on the 11 disk Philips boxed set Swingle Singers.

Track listing
all compositions by J.S. Bach
"Vivace" from Concerto for 2 violins, strings & continuo in D minor ("Double"), BWV 1043 – 3:19
"Prelude and Fugue, for keyboard No. 10 in E minor" (WTC I), BWV 855 (BC L89) – 3:01
"Choral" from Cantata No. 147, "Herz und Mund und Tat und Leben," BWV 147 (BC A174) – 3:28
"Gavotte" from Partita for solo violin No. 3 in E major, BWV 1006 – 2:30
"Prelude and Fugue, for keyboard No. 1 in C major" (WTC I), BWV 846 (BC L80) – 3:22
"Fugue" from Prelude and Fugue, for organ in G major, BWV 541 (BC J22) – 3:19
"Adagio" from Sonata for violin & keyboard No. 3 in E major, BWV 1016 – 3:56
"Prelude and Fugue, for keyboard No. 3 in C sharp major" (WTC I), BWV 848 (BC L82) – 3:18
"Prelude" from "Nun komm der Heiden Heiland" (II), chorale prelude for organ (Achtzehn Choräle No. 8), BWV 659 (BC K82) – 3:30
"Fugue" for keyboard No. 21 in B flat major" (WTC I), BWV 866 (BC L100) – 1:24

Personnel
Vocals:
Jeanette Baucomont – soprano
Christiane Legrand – soprano
Hélène Devos – alto
Claudine Meunier – alto
Ward Swingle – tenor, arranger
Joseph Noves – tenor
Jean Cussac – bass
Jose Germain – bass
Rhythm section:
Pierre Michelot – double bass
Bernard Lubat or Daniel Humair – drums

References / external links
Philips PHS 600-288
Verve 542553
Jazz Sebastian Bach Vol. 2 at [ allmusic.com]

The Swingle Singers albums
1968 albums
French-language albums
Philips Records albums
Verve Records albums
Arrangements of compositions by Johann Sebastian Bach